Ro07-5220 (6'-Chlorodiclazepam) is a benzodiazepine derivative with sedative, anxiolytic, anticonvulsant and muscle relaxant effects, which has been sold as a designer drug.

See also 
 Diclazepam
 Difludiazepam
 Ro20-8065

References 

Designer drugs
GABAA receptor positive allosteric modulators
Fluoroarenes
Benzodiazepines
Chlorobenzenes